Overbrook High School phenom Wilt Chamberlain joined the Warriors. Chamberlain would have an immediate impact as he won the Rookie of the Year Award and the NBA Most Valuable Player.
He led the league in scoring and rebounds. He averaged 37.6 points per game and 27.0 rebounds per game. The Warriors finished in 2nd place with a 49–26 record. In the playoffs, the Warriors played the Syracuse Nationals. The Warriors beat them 2 games to 1. In the Eastern Finals, Chamberlain was matched against Bill Russell. In the end, the Boston Celtics would emerge victorious in 6 games.

Roster

Regular season

Season standings

Record vs. opponents

Game log

Playoffs

|- align="center" bgcolor="#ccffcc"
| 1
| March 11
| Syracuse
| W 115–92
| Paul Arizin (40)
| Wilt Chamberlain (27)
| Tom Gola (7)
| Philadelphia Civic Center
| 1–0
|- align="center" bgcolor="#ffcccc"
| 2
| March 13
| @ Syracuse
| L 119–125
| Paul Arizin (29)
| Wilt Chamberlain (18)
| Guy Rodgers (6)
| Onondaga War Memorial
| 1–1
|- align="center" bgcolor="#ccffcc"
| 3
| March 14
| Syracuse
| W 132–112
| Wilt Chamberlain (53)
| Tom Gola (23)
| Tom Gola (11)
| Philadelphia Civic Center
| 2–1
|-

|- align="center" bgcolor="#ffcccc"
| 1
| March 16
| @ Boston
| L 105–111
| Wilt Chamberlain (42)
| Wilt Chamberlain (29)
| Paul Arizin (5)
| Boston Garden
| 0–1
|- align="center" bgcolor="#ccffcc"
| 2
| March 18
| Boston
| W 115–110
| Paul Arizin (30)
| Wilt Chamberlain (28)
| Guy Rodgers (9)
| Philadelphia Civic Center
| 1–1
|- align="center" bgcolor="#ffcccc"
| 3
| March 19
| @ Boston
| L 90–120
| Woody Sauldsberry (22)
| Wilt Chamberlain (15)
| Wilt Chamberlain (6)
| Boston Garden
| 1–2
|- align="center" bgcolor="#ffcccc"
| 4
| March 20
| Boston
| L 104–112
| Paul Arizin (35)
| Wilt Chamberlain (34)
| Guy Rodgers (5)
| Philadelphia Civic Center
| 1–3
|- align="center" bgcolor="#ccffcc"
| 5
| March 22
| @ Boston
| W 128–107
| Wilt Chamberlain (50)
| Wilt Chamberlain (35)
| Tom Gola (10)
| Boston Garden
| 2–3
|- align="center" bgcolor="#ffcccc"
| 6
| March 24
| Boston
| L 117–119
| Guy Rodgers (31)
| Wilt Chamberlain (24)
| Guy Rodgers (9)
| Philadelphia Civic Center
| 2–4
|-

Awards and honors
 Wilt Chamberlain, NBA Most Valuable Player Award
 Wilt Chamberlain, NBA All-Star Game Most Valuable Player Award
 Wilt Chamberlain, NBA All-Star Game
 Paul Arizin, NBA All-Star Game
 Tom Gola, NBA All-Star Game
 Wilt Chamberlain, NBA Scoring Champion
 Wilt Chamberlain, NBA Rookie of the Year Award
 Wilt Chamberlain, All-NBA First Team

References

 Warriors on Basketball Reference

Golden State Warriors seasons
Philadelphia